San Pietro in Oliveto is a Roman Catholic church located at the end of via del Castello in central Brescia, region of Lombardy, Italy.

History
The church was founded in late 11th or early 12th-centuries, and began attached a Benedictine convent. The name was derived from the olive groves once on Cidneo hill. The convent was destroyed during a siege in 1433. In 1487, it was transferred to the Canons of San Giorgio in Alega of Venice, and reconstruction in the 16th century under the design of Antonio Medaglia. The order was suppressed in 1668, and it became property of a Carmelite order. These were expelled in 1799, and in 1805, it was made part of a seminary.
 
The altarpiece in the second altar on the left depicting St John of the Cross in contemplation is attributed to Giuseppe Tortelli.

An inventory from 1856 lists the following works:
Virgin above San Lorenzo Giustiniani with St John the Evangelist and Holy Wisdom by Moretto da Brescia
Scapular of the Carmelites carried by Angels by Francesco Paglia
Adoration of the Magi attributed to Agostino Galeazzi
Virgin and St Theresa of Avila by Domenico Carretti
St Theresa praying before the Redeemer attributed to Bernardo Strozzi
St Theresa in Ecstasy by Angelo Trevisano
Saint Peter, with St Paul, receives the Keys to Heaven main altarpiece  by Moretto da Brescia
By Francesco Ricchino 
Moses as an infant rescued from the Nile (1566) by 
Moses defends the seven sons of Madian
Moses makes water flow from a stone
Moses and sunders the tablets of the law
Two Prophets over lateral door
Two Saints flanking lateral altar
Two Miracles of St John of the Cross by Giuseppe Tortelli
Victory of Christians led by fra Gesù Maria Carmelitano against the Duke of the Palatine of the Rhine in 1620 (presumably Battle of White Mountain) by Andrea Celesti
Christ on the Road to Calvary, attributed to Foppa, Rossi, or Paolo Zoppo
St Theresa and Jesus Child by Andrea Celesti
St John of the Cross crowned by Jesus by Pompeo Ghitti

References

Renaissance architecture in Brescia
16th-century Roman Catholic church buildings in Italy
Roman Catholic churches in Brescia